A by-election was held for the Australian House of Representatives seat of Werriwa on 1 June 1912. This was triggered by the resignation of Labor MP David Hall.

The by-election was won by Labor candidate Benjamin Bennett.

Results

References

1912 elections in Australia
New South Wales federal by-elections
1910s in New South Wales